The 2015–16 FA Cup (also known as the FA Challenge Cup) was the 135th edition of the oldest recognised football tournament in the world. It was sponsored by Emirates, and known as The Emirates FA Cup for sponsorship purposes. It began with the Extra Preliminary Round on 15 August 2015, and concluded with the final on 21 May 2016. The FA Cup winner qualifies for the 2016–17 UEFA Europa League group stage.

Premier League side Arsenal were the two-time defending champions after they beat Aston Villa 4–0 in the previous final on 30 May 2015, but were eliminated by Watford in the sixth round.

The winners were Manchester United, who defeated Crystal Palace 2–1 in the final after extra time.

Teams

Prize fund

Round and draw dates
The schedule are as follows.

Qualifying rounds 

The qualifying competition began with the Extra Preliminary Round on 15 August 2015. All of the competing teams that were not members of either the Premier League or the Football League had to compete in the qualifying rounds to win a place in the first round proper. The final (fourth) qualifying round began on the weekend of 24 October.

First round proper
The First Round draw took place on 26 October at 7pm at the club house of the FA Charter Standard Community Club Thackley Juniors F.C. based in Thackley in West Yorkshire, and was broadcast live on BBC Two and BBC Radio 5 Live. The First Round Proper were played on the weekend of 7 November. 32 teams from the qualifying competition joined the 48 teams from League One and League Two to compete in this round. The round included two teams from Level 8 still in the competition, Northwich Victoria and Didcot Town, which were the lowest-ranked teams in this round; Northwich Victoria advanced to become the lowest-ranked team in the second round.

Second round proper
The second round draw took place on 9 November at Civil Service, based in Chiswick, London,  and was broadcast live on BBC Two.

The lowest-ranked side in this round was Northwich Victoria, who competed at level 8 of English football.

Third round proper
A total of 64 teams played in this round: 44 teams from Premier League and Football League Championship which entered in this round, and the 20 winners of the previous round. The draw was held on 7 December 2015.

The lowest-ranked team in this round was Eastleigh from the National League (tier 5), the only non-league side remaining in the competition.

Fourth round proper
The draw for the fourth round proper was held on 11 January 2016. The fourth round proper was played across the weekend of 30 January 2016.

The three lowest ranked teams in this round were Oxford United, Portsmouth and Carlisle United, who competed in League Two (tier 4).

Fifth Round Proper
The draw for the Fifth Round Proper was held on 31 January 2016. The fifth round proper was played across the weekend of 20 February 2016.

The lowest ranked club in this round was Shrewsbury Town, who competed in League One (tier 3).

Sixth Round Proper
The draw for the Sixth Round Proper was held on 21 February 2016. The sixth round proper was played across the weekend of 12 March 2016. This marked the final year where the sixth round would go into a replay if teams were tied.

The lowest ranked club remaining in this round was Reading, who competed in the League Championship (tier 2).

Semi-finals
The draw for the semi-finals was held on 14 March 2016. The semi-finals were played on 23 and 24 April 2016.

Final

The final took place on 21 May 2016 at Wembley Stadium.

Top goalscorers

Broadcasting rights
The domestic broadcasting rights for the competition were held by the BBC and subscription channel BT Sport. The BBC held the rights since 2014–15, while BT Sport since 2013–14. The FA Cup Final was required to be broadcast live on UK terrestrial television under the Ofcom code of protected sporting events.

The following matches were broadcast live on UK television:

Welsh language channel S4C broadcast the third round match between Cardiff City and Shrewsbury Town, and also broadcast the rescheduled third round match between Newport County and Blackburn Rovers.

Notes

References

 
FA Cup seasons
England